Deluxe Marketing Inc. (DMI) is a private company that offers management-consulting services. Deluxe Marketing Inc. is known for focusing on direct, in-person marketing strategies. The company was named one of the fastest-growing private companies in Silicon Valley. Inc. magazine ranked the company as one of the fastest-growing businesses in the United States in 2010, 2011, and 2012. Jeremy Larson founded the company in 2003.

History
Larson, who previously worked as vice president of a national credit card promotion with Wal-Mart and Target, founded Deluxe Marking Inc. in 2003. Larson co-authored the book "The Ultimate Success Guide: The World's Leading Experts Reveal Their Secrets for Success in Business and in Life". Larson reached best selling author recognition on the day of release, The Ultimate Success Guide: The World's Leading Experts Reveal Their Secrets for Success in Business and in Life reached best-seller status in five Amazon.com categories - reaching as high as #2 in the Direct Marketing category.  The book also reached best-seller status in the Entrepreneurship; Marketing; Marketing and Sales; and 'Small Business and Entrepreneurship' categories. Larson also co-wrote  Secrets Of The Inc. 500: Strategies to Grow Your Business Fast and Outrun Your Competitors.

Deluxe Marketing Inc.'s main office is in Las Vegas, Nevada. The company has 29 additional offices.

Products and services
Deluxe Marketing Inc. offers marketing, contracting, and staffing services. DMI describes four main service types: home security, door-to-door services, event marketing, and retail sales staffing services.

Awards and recognition
Deluxe Marketing Inc. was ranked #3 in fastest-growing private companies in Silicon Valley in 2010 and 42nd fastest-growing in 2012. The Silicon Valley Business Journal reported DMI netted 889% revenue growth between 2007 and 2010.

Deluxe Marketing has been recognized by Inc. Magazine on three separate occasions as one of Americas fastest growing companies as part of the Inc 500. In 2010, Deluxe Marketing Inc. was ranked #55 on Inc. Magazine's Inc. 5000 List of Top Advertising and Marketing Companies. In 2012, DMI ranked #45 in Advertising and Marketing Companies and #423 on the overall 5000 List. DMI was ranked #227 in 2011's Inc. Magazine fastest growing companies. DMI was also ranked the 85th fastest growing private company by Inc. Magazine in 2010.

References

External links
Official website

Companies based in Las Vegas